The Oldest Russian derby is a football rivalry played between Moscow rivals FC Spartak Moscow and FC Dynamo Moscow. 
The derby became less intense as Dynamo Moscow has not won a title since 1976 and only once succeeded in domestic competitions since the fall of the Soviet Union. Spartak missed the 1977 season of the Soviet League due to relegation, while Dynamo missed the 2016–17 season of the Russian Premier League.

History

Game of political importance
This Moscow derby has also a political dimension. The teams fought each other for the championship of Moscow, and then for the Soviet Top League. In 1942, the founder and footballer of Spartak, Nikolai Starostin, was arrested, along with his three brothers among other teammates, facing accusations of involvement in a plot to kill Joseph Stalin. After two years of interrogations, the charges were dropped but the Starostin brothers were tried and sentenced to spend 10 years in the camps of Siberia. Throughout all those years, Nikolai Starostin had always believed that Lavrentiy Beria, Dynamo Moscow's chief patron, was the one behind all this. Returning from prison, Nikolai Starostin became chairman of Spartak again and always demanded from his players at all costs to beat Dynamo.

Decline
Around the end of the 1970s, the Spartak-Dynamo rivalry had lost its status in Soviet football; the blue-and-whites were slowly declining and Dynamo Kiev became the main rival of the red-and-whites.

Honours

Crossing the divide

Players who have played for both clubs

 Sort by date of birth
 A partial list of players

Managers worked in both clubs

Statistics

Head-to-head record

Head-to-head record in Russian Football National League

Record wins

Spartak biggest wins 

1991 — Soviet Top League — Spartak — Dynamo 7:1
1985 —Soviet Top League — Spartak — Dynamo 5:1
2005 — Russian Premier League — Spartak — Dynamo 5:1
2012 — Russian Premier League — Dynamo — Spartak 0:4

Dynamo biggest wins 

1946 — Soviet Top League — Dynamo — Spartak 5:0
1940 — Soviet Top League — Spartak — Dynamo 1:5
1945 — Soviet Top League — Dynamo — Spartak 4:0
1948 — Soviet Top League — Dynamo — Spartak 5:1
1966 — Soviet Top League — Dynamo — Dynamo 4:0
2012 — Russian Premier League — Spartak — Dynamo 1:5

Matches list

Soviet Top League 1936 - 1992

Russian League 1992 -

Soviet Cup 1936 - 1992

Russian Cup 1992 -

FC Spartak Moscow
Спартак
Football derbies in Russia